The 2011–12 Louisville Cardinals men's basketball team represented the University of Louisville during the 2011–12 NCAA Division I men's basketball season, Louisville's 98th season of intercollegiate competition. The Cardinals competed in the Big East Conference and were coached by Rick Pitino, who was in his 11th season. The team played their home games on Denny Crum Court at the KFC Yum! Center. The Cardinals finished the season with a record of 30–10, 10–8 to finish in sixth place in Big East play. They defeated Seton Hall, Marquette, and Notre Dame to advance to the Big East tournament championship. In the championship game, they defeated Cincinnati to win the tournament for the second time. As a result of the win, the Cardinals received the conference's automatic bid to the NCAA tournament as the No. 4 seed in the West region. Louisville defeated Davidson and New Mexico to advance to the Sweet Sixteen. There they defeated No. 1-seeded Michigan State and Florida to advance to the Final Four for the ninth time in school history. In the Final Four, they lost to the eventual National Champion Kentucky.

On February 20, 2018, the NCAA announced that the wins and records for the season and Louisville's 2012–13, 2013–14, and 2014–15 seasons were vacated due to the sex scandal at Louisville.

Previous season 
The Cardinals finished the 2010–11 season with a record 25–10, 12–6 to finish in a tie for third place in Big East play. They received an at-large bid to the NCAA tournament where they were upset in the second round (round of 64) by Morehead State.

Preseason

Departures

2011 recruiting class

Roster

Schedule and results

|-
!colspan=12 style="background:#AD0000; color:#FFFFFF;"| Exhibition

|-
!colspan=12 style="background:#AD0000; color:#FFFFFF;"|Regular Season

|-
!colspan=12 style="background:#AD0000; color:#FFFFFF;"| Big East tournament
   
  
  
  
|-
!colspan=12 style="background:#AD0000; color:#FFFFFF;"| NCAA tournament

Awards

Big East All-Tournament Team 

 Gorgui Dieng
 Kyle Kuric
 Peyton Siva

Big East tournament Most Outstanding Player 

 Peyton Siva

NCAA (West) Regional All-Tournament Team 
 Chane Behanan
 Gorgui Dieng
 Peyton Siva

NCAA (West) Regional Most Outstanding Player 

 Chane Behanan

Rankings

References

Louisville Cardinals Men's Basketball Team, 2011-11
Louisville Cardinals men's basketball seasons
Louisville
NCAA Division I men's basketball tournament Final Four seasons
Louisville Cardinals men's basketball, 2011-12
Louisville Cardinals men's basketball, 2011-12